Marcos Juan Bruno Oppen Cojuangco (born October 6, 1957), known as Mark Cojuangco, is a Filipino politician and businessman. He is a former Representative of 5th District of Pangasinan, in the Philippines, he also served as the vice-chairman of Committee on Appropriations.

House Bill 04631 and English Wikipedia
Cojuangco is the author of the controversial House Bill 04631 that mandates the immediate re-commissioning and commercial operation of the Bataan Nuclear Power Plant, appropriating funds therefor, and for other purposes. His presentation of the bill at the Congressional hearing on February 2, 2009 came under scrutiny from the opposition for citing English Wikipedia articles about nuclear plants in other countries and quotes from non-experts to argue for the re-commissioning of the Bataan Nuclear Power Plant.

Personal life
Cojuangco is the eldest son of Eduardo Cojuangco, Jr. and Soledad "Gretchen" Oppen.

He is married to Ma. Carmen "Kimi" Shulze. The couple have three children: Danielle, Paola and Eduardo III.

Political career

From 2001 to 2010, Cojuangco served as the Representative of the 5th District of Pangasinan. He focused on infrastructure projects, believing that quality and not just the quantity of projects, are the catalyst for economic development.

His accomplishments include: the lobbying for and successful monetization and continuous release of the 12 years overdue tobacco tax share of Burley tobacco producing areas throughout the country amounting to 6.5Billion pesos, initially. Innovations such as: precast concrete arch bridges of 12m spans, concrete tower silos, people’s donation for road right of way of widened barangay roads, advanced drilling technology which resulted in truly potable barangay water systems, prepaid water dispensing, multi-level school buildings, surface irrigation systems, travelling irrigator systems, radial irrigation gates, the use of digital terrain models in flood basin drainage design and implementation, among others. Not even public restrooms were spared of innovation, as 5-star facilities now exist in the town plazas of his district, being most welcome by balikbayans, returning OFWs and kamag-anaks from abroad as well as their guests.

His last projects include the widening and rehabilitation of the Manila North Road and the initiation of the Western Urdaneta Bypass Road which he believes will make Urdaneta the premiere city of Pangasinan.

Even after his nine years as Congressman, Cojuangco continues to work for the betterment of the 5th District of Pangasinan. He is currently working on the completion of the establishment of a regional Tropical Dairy Industry, which he started in 2004. The first module, located in the barangay of Maraboc in Laoac, Pangasinan is already nearing completion. With this module alone, the 5th District of Pangasinan Dairy and Minor Livestock Cooperative already produces an average of 1,500 liters of fresh milk a day, with 5,000 liters/day as an ultimate goal. This has led to the filing of House Bill 4441 by his wife Rep. Kimi S. Cojuangco, who was the former Mayor of Sison and now incumbent representative of the 5th District of Pangasinan, which is aimed at protecting the local Dairy Industry.

He ran as Governor of Pangasinan in 2016, as he supported the candidacy of Vice President Jejomar Binay and Sen. Bongbong Marcos as President and Vice President respectively.

In 2022, he successfully sought a comeback to the Congress, this time for the 2nd District of Pangasinan. He changed his residency from Sison to Lingayen. He defeated incumbent representative Jumel Anthony Espino.

References

|-

1957 births
Living people
People from Pangasinan
Members of the House of Representatives of the Philippines from Pangasinan
Cojuangco family
Filipino people of German descent
Filipino people of Irish descent
Filipino people of Spanish descent
Filipino politicians of Chinese descent